Igor the Assassin is an SVR and former KGB officer who allegedly killed Alexander Litvinenko and escaped back to Russia. He was among the members of a group consisting of former KGB agents called 'Dignity and Honor'. According to one version of the Alexander Litvinenko poisoning, the official suspect of the murder, Andrei Lugovoi, only distracted the attention of Litvinenko, while "Igor the Assassin" placed the radioactive polonium into the cup of tea served for Litvinenko. "Igor the Assassin" was later seen on his way back to Russia in an airport in London.

His name and true identity remain unknown. He was said to be a former Spetznaz officer born in 1960 who is a judo master and walks with a slight limp. He speaks perfect English and Portuguese.

See also
Alexander Litvinenko poisoning

References

Year of death missing
Soviet Army officers
Russian assassins
Contract killers
KGB officers
1960 births
Unidentified people